"No Doubt About It" is a May 1980 single by the British pop group Hot Chocolate.

It became their highest-charting hit of the 1980s, peaking at number 2 on the UK Singles Chart, a position "You Sexy Thing" had also reached five years before. The two songs are, however, outdone by their 1977 chart-topper, "So You Win Again", which was Hot Chocolate's only Number 1 single in the UK.

"No Doubt About It" was released on RAK label under the catalogue reference RAK 310, and spent eleven weeks in the chart.

The tune was written by Mike Burns, Steve Glen and David Most (the brother of the band's manager, Mickie Most).  The song deals with the experiences of a man who witnesses a UFO landing. The song was remixed by Frank Mono and released as a single for a second time in 1988.

Track listing

1980 release
7" vinyl / 12" vinyl
"No Doubt About It" (David Most, Mike Burns, Steve Glen) – 4:25
"Gimme Some Of Your Loving" (Harvey Hinsley, Patrick Olive, Tony Connor) – 3:37

1988 remix
7" vinyl
"No Doubt About It (Little Tequila Mix)" (David Most, Mike Burns, Steve Glen) – 3:51
"I Gave You My Heart (Didn't I)" (Richard Gower) – 3:39

12" vinyl
"No Doubt About It (Tequila Mix)" (David Most, Mike Burns, Steve Glen) – 6:44
"No Doubt About It (Little Tequila Mix)" (David Most, Mike Burns, Steve Glen) – 3:51
"I Gave You My Heart (Didn't I)" (Richard Gower) – 3:39

Chart positions

Certifications

References

External links
   

1980 singles
1980 songs
Hot Chocolate (band) songs
RAK Records singles
Song recordings produced by Mickie Most
Songs about extraterrestrial life
Songs about spaceflight